Soh Kwang-pom or Seo Gwang-beom (8 November 1859 – 17 July 1897) (Hangul: 서광범, Hanja: 徐光範) was a Korean reformist and politician of Korea's late Joseon Dynasty.

Soh Kwang-Pom, sometimes Pom Kwang Soh or known by his English name: Kennedy (or Kenneth) Suh, was born into the Daegu Seo clan. Seo married Lady of the Andong Kim Clan when he was a young boy, but Lady Kim had died at a young age to which led him to marry again and then a third time. He was close to his late wife's relative, Kim Ok-gyun, who brought enlightenment and thoughts to him when he was young. Seo later became close with Park Yeong-hyo, Park Chan-ju's grandfather (the wife of Prince Yi U).

He was the Minister of Justice, a Korean minister to the United States, an envoy to the Queen's Jubilee and a one-time political refugee and exile.

Kwang-Pom was born into an aristocratic family of Korea and rose quickly through the political ranks. He was sent to Washington as an attache of the Korean Legation, but returned to Korea to take part in a temporarily successful revolution. That was overthrown and he was forced to return to America where he spent 10 years in exile, working for a time as a messenger in the Bureau of Education making a very modest salary. He was recalled to Korea where he was named Minister of Justice, where he led several important reforms. He was then sent London as the Korean envoy to the Jubilee before returning to Korea to become a privy councilor to the King of Korea. He was sent back to Washington as an envoy where he served as Minister.

He died on 17 July 1897 in Washington, DC after an illness of a few days following his collapse after a bicycle ride. His remains were cremated.

Trivia  
Seo Gwang-beom's 6th great-grandfather was the older brother of Queen Jeongseong; who was a Joseon Dynasty Queen during the late 17th century.

Family  
 Great-Grandfather
 Seo Eung-bo (서응보, 徐應輔)
 Great-Grandmother 
 Lady Kim of the Gyeongju Kim clan (경주 김씨)
 Grandfather 
 Seo Dae-sun (서대순, 徐戴淳) (1805 - 1871)
 Grandmother 
 Lady Hong (홍씨, 洪氏)
 Father
 Seo Sang-ik (서상익, 徐相翊) (1835 - 1884)
 Mother
 Lady Park of the Bannam Park clan (반남 박씨, 潘南朴氏)
 Maternal grandfather: Park Je-won (박제완, 朴齊完)
 Wives 
 Lady Kim of the Andong Kim clan (안동 김씨); daughter of Kim Byeong-ji (김병지의 딸) (? - 1874)
 Lady Kim of the Gwangsan Kim clan (광산 김씨)
 Lady Park of the Miryang Park clan (밀양 박씨); daughter of Park Seung-han (박승헌의 딸)
 Son
 Adoptive son: Seo Jae-deok (서재덕, 徐載德); son of the Seo Gwang-jeong (서광정, 徐光鼎)

References

1859 births
Date of birth missing
Place of birth missing
1897 deaths
19th-century politicians
Joseon politicians
Cycling road incident deaths